Jennifer Esmerelda Hylton, known professionally as Foxy Brown, is a Jamaican reggae singer.  Her first introduction to the reggae charts was via the Steely & Clevie-produced versions of Tracy Chapman's "(Sorry) Baby, Can I Hold You Tonight" and "Fast Car," the former even entering Billboard's Black Singles Chart. These led to her being regarded as Jamaica's Tracy Chapman. She released her debut album Foxy, in 1989, which showcased her original songwriting. In 1990 she had a hit with the dancehall single "Always For Me", and a second album, My Kind of Girl, followed in the same year. She also had a hit with Johnny P called "If you Love Me".

Discography 
Foxy (1989), RAS/Sanctuary/BMG
My Kind of Girl (1990), RAS/Sanctuary/BMG
Whip Appeal (1992), VP
Reggae Gangs (2008), VP

References 

20th-century Jamaican women singers
Living people
Jamaican reggae singers
Year of birth missing (living people)
VP Records artists